Thala maldivensis is a species of small sea snail, a marine gastropod mollusk. It resides in the family Costellariidae, otherwise referred to as the ribbed miters.

Description

Distribution
This marine species occurs off the Maldives.

References

Costellariidae
Gastropods described in 2007